Shumilino is an urban-type settlement in the Shumilina Raion, Belarus. Its location is 40 kilometers northwest of Vitebsk. 
The population is 7,500 people.

History
In 1939, 376 Jews lived in the town, making up 16% of the total population. After the German invasion of Poland, a significant population of Polish Jews came to the city. The city was under German occupation from 1941 to 1944.

The Jewish inhabitants were kept imprisoned in an enclosed ghetto in August 1941. The ghetto was liquidated on November 19, 1941, when the Germans and local police perpetrated a mass execution of around 300 Jews. After the shootings, witnesses recounted that the Jewish houses were plundered.

Gallery

References

External links
 

Vitebsk Region
Jewish Belarusian history
Holocaust locations in Belarus